Little Trapeze Angels (Spanish: "Angelitos del trapecio") is a 1959 Mexican comedy film starring Viruta and Capulina (Marco Antonio Campos and Gaspar Henaine), Anabelle Gutiérrez, and Maricruz Olivier. The film was written by Roberto Gómez Bolaños.

Story 
Viruta and Capulina drive across the country selling miraculous water, which they found sprouting from a rock after saying a very particular word. They arrive at a circus owned by the clown Rigoletto. Rigoletto, who has gout, is also the father of Pulgarcito, a boy, and aerialists Tina and Lina. This disease has him bedridden and with severe leg pain, thus unable to perform.

Viruta and Capulina convince people of their miracle product's credibility, which they call The Elixir That Cures Everything. Rigoletto finds out and asks his daughters to bring these two "doctors" to him after the performance.

Viruta and Capulina enter the circus tent and promote their Elixir That Cures Everything. However, Rigoletto still can't act, so Viruta and Capulina go on stage to perform Rigoletto's number. Both are invited to stay in the circus to the public's liking, sympathizing with Tina and Lina. The girls' suitors and Pulgarcito, the aerialists' brother, don't like the idea and decide to disguise themselves as ghosts and scare the two new members.

Capulina climbs onto the trapeze platform believing that one of her assistants is trying to make Lina fall. In an attempt to rescue her, Capulina ends up swinging on a trapeze without reaching the edge. Viruta decides to help his friend in danger but has the same fate since neither knows how to use the trapeze correctly. Finally, both fall to the ground and end up significantly injured, but thanks to their elixir, they recover their health.

Viruta and Capulina confess that they are not doctors and that their Elixir That Cures Everything is simply water. Still, the evidence was clear, Rigoletto has been cured of gout, the magician of pain from an ulcer, and them of their fall. Hence, they decide to return to the rock where the miraculous water gushed out.

Comically, Capulina does not remember the magic word used to sprout the magic water. Still, Pulgarcito managed to pronounce Parangaricutirimícuaro (pa-ran-gari-cuti-rimi-cua-ro). The water gushed out again, changing the lives of those present.

Cast

References

External links

Mexican comedy films
Circus films
Films with screenplays by Roberto Gómez Bolaños
1950s Mexican films